Pretty Boy Floyd was a Canadian hard rock band from Vancouver, British Columbia, Canada.

History
This Canadian hard rock band released an EP and an LP, both named Bullets & Lipstik.

They were most successful in the United Kingdom, where Bullets & Lipstik was a Top 10 hit on the indie charts in 1988.

During their career, the band opened for Skid Row, Hurricane, Savatage, Teenage Head, and Jailhouse. The Canadian Pretty Boy Floyd got into a legal battle with the American Pretty Boy Floyd. The Canadians owned the rights to the name, but could not proceed legally as the American Pretty Boy Floyd had filed for the American trademark. The American PBF could not use the name "Pretty Boy Floyd" on the Karate Kid III soundtrack and was forced to use the acronym "PBF". When the American band was signed to MCA Records, Kerrang magazine mistakenly printed the Canadian band's picture with the heading "Floyd Signs To MCA" The band renamed itself Tommy Floyd (after the lead singer) following the departure of guitarist Pete Parker. Tommy Floyd added two guitars and retained the original PBF rhythm section for a short period prior to regrouping with a new solo line up.

Singer/songwriter and founder Tommy Floyd went on to launch the music management company Outlaw Entertainment International, working with members of Salty Dog, Dangerous Toys and Celtic Frost. Outlaw Recordings helped former PBF guitarist Pete Parker in the launching of his blues-based trio, Billy Butcher.

Guitarist Pete Parker, sang lead vocals as well as playing guitar. Butcher released the album Penny Dreadful. Drummer Sandy Hazard was later in the band Grandma Moses, which released the album Too Little Too Late. Hazard is now in the pop punk band Mcrackins and sings for Vancouver rock band Dirtbag Republic.

Line-up
 Tommy Floyd - lead vocals
 Pete Parker - guitar
 Steve Bratz - bass guitar
 Sandy Hazard - drums

Discography
 Bullets & Lipstik (EP) Hanover Records (1988)
 Bullets & Lipstik (CD/LP) Bellaphon Records 1989
Bullets & Lipstik (Cassette/LP) Music Line Records 1989

References

External links

Canadian glam metal musical groups